Colin Seery (born 1 October 1957) is  a former Australian rules footballer who played with North Melbourne and Footscray in the Victorian Football League (VFL).

Notes

External links 
		

Living people
1957 births
Australian rules footballers from Victoria (Australia)
North Melbourne Football Club players
Western Bulldogs players